The Battle of Kasahrada, also known as Battle of Kayadara or Battle of Gadararaghatta was fought in 1178 at modern Kayandra in Sirohi district near Mount Abu. It was fought between the Rajput Confederacy led by Mularaja II and the invading Ghurid forces led by Muhammad Ghuri. The Rajput forces defeated and routed the Ghurids, although Mu'izz al-din managed to retreat to Ghazni.

Background 

As Ghurid expansion was blocked in the west by Khwarazmian Empire, Ghurid looked east towards India. After capturing Multan and Uch, Ghori turned south towards Rajputana instead of taking on weakened Ghaznavid Empire. After marching through sandy desert of Rajputana, he reached near Abu Hill where Chaulukya(Solanki) army along with their feudatory the Chahamanas of Nadol, Chahamanas of Jalor and Paramaras of Chandravati under command of Chaulukya(Solanki) ruler Mularaja barred the path of Ghori.

Battle 

Ghurid army after capturing Nadol, reached at foothills of Abu. At the mouth of the Abu pass, Ghurid army was opposed by combined army of Chaulukya feudatories i.e. Dharavarsha Paramara of Abu, Kelhana Chauhan of Nadol and his brother Kirtipala Chauhan of Jalor. According to Prabandha Kosha
Dharavarsha let Ghurid army into the pass and closed the enemy retreat behind them. In front of Ghurids, facing them was the main Chaulukya army along with Chauhans of Nadol and Jalore. After a sanguinary battle, Ghurid army was signally defeated with great slaughter.  Mu'izz who got wounded in action, fled from the battlefield; after much trouble in the flight he finally reached Ghazni.

Aftermath 

After this decisive defeat Ghori didn't dare attack so far into India without getting a firm base. For more than a decade Ghurids didn't attack India, rather he focused on consolidating and annexing territories of Ghaznavids in Punjab.

By last quarter of twelfth century, Mu'izz al-din defeated and executed the last of crumbling Ghaznavid rulers and captured their region along with plundering Lahore, the capital of Ghaznavids. After capturing fertile land of Punjab and increasing his reserve he invaded domain of Rajputs again in 1191. However, Prithviraj Chauhan led a coalition of Rajput rulers and utterly defeated his forces in First Battle of Tarain in present-day Taraori, Haryana.

Sources

Native accounts 

The later Chaulukya(Solanki) inscriptions, as well as the chroniclers of Gujarat, greatly praise Mularaja for this victory:

 The poet Someshvara writes that Mularaja defeated the lord of Turushkas (Turkic people), and crushed the mlechchha (foreign) army.
 Balachandra mentions that Mularaja defeated the mlechchha king despite being an infant.
 Udayaprabha Suri, in his Sukrita-Kirti-Kallolini, states that Naikidevi gave Mularaja an army to play with. With this army, Mularaja defeated the Hammira (Sanskrit form of Emir) and his mlechchha army, whose soldiers were covered from head to toe in order to protect themselves.
 Arisimha also mentions that Mularaja defeated the Muslims.
 An inscription of Bhima II states that even a woman could defeat Hammira during the reign of Mularaja.

The 14th century chronicler Merutunga credits the victory to Mularaja's mother Naikidevi, introducing supernatural elements in his account of the battle.

The Sundha Hill inscription of the Jalor Chahamanas boasts that Kirtipala routed the Turushka army at Kasahrada. It also states that his brother Kelhanadeva erected a golden gateway (torana) at the shrine of the deity Somesha after destroying the Turushkas. Kelhanadeva was the ruler of Naddula; according to the legendary chronicle Prithviraja Vijaya, Muhammad of Ghor had captured Naddula during his invasion of India. Kelhanadeva managed to regain control of Naddula after the victory at Kasahrada.

Muslim accounts 

According to the 13th century Persian chronicler Minhaj-i-Siraj, Muhammad of Ghor marched towards Nahrwala (the Chaulukya capital Anahilavada) via Uchchha and Multan. The "Rae of Nahrwala" (the Chaulukya king) was young but commanded a huge army with elephants. In the ensuing battle, "the army of Islam was defeated and put to rout", and the invading ruler had to return without any accomplishment.

Nizam-ud-din gives a similar account and states that Muhammad of Ghor marched to Gujarat via desert. The 16th century writer Badauni also mentions the invader's defeat, and states that he retreated to Ghazni with great difficulty. Firishta also states that the ruler of Gujarat defeated the Muslim army "with great slaughter", and the remnant of the defeated army faced many hardships during its return journey to Ghazni.

Alternative chronology 

None of the Chaulukya inscriptions and chroniclers mentions the invading king's name, simply describing him as a mlechchha, Turushka or Hammira. However, modern historians identify him with Muhammad of Ghor.

According to an alternative theory, the Battle of Kasahrada took place during the reign of Mularaja's successor Bhima II. This theory is based on some Muslim chronicles, which state that "Bhim Dev" was the one who defeated Muhammad of Ghor. Moreover, an 1178 Kiradu inscription, issued during Bhima's reign, records repairs to a temple damaged by the Turushkas. The proponents of this theory argue that Mularaja's forces defeated another king, or that Muhammad of Ghor invaded the Chaulukya territory twice around 1178 CE.

In popular culture 
The 2022 Gujarati historical film Nayika Devi: The Warrior Queen depicts the battle of Kasahrada.

References

Bibliography 

 
 
 
 
 
 

Kasahrada
Kasahrada
History of Rajasthan
Kasahrada
1178 in Asia
12th century in India